The Ongkor Festival (Wylie: , or  in some dialects) is one of most important Tibetan festival of the Tibetan lunar year. Ongkor is usually held at the end of summer. The meaning of the festival's name is "good wishes for harvest", literally "making a circle around the field". During this festival, one person from each family in the village participates in kora in the fields. People in the procession dress in traditional clothes and play different roles—warriors, riders, drummers, those praying, or monks. In some regions Tibetan opera, dancing to drums and horse racing is performed. During this festival, many different aspects of traditional Tibetan culture are shown, including singing, dancing, the art of debate, dressing and praying.

Recently the festival has been known as the Horse Race Festival, due to travel agencies who want to attract tourists.
Tibetan festivals
Harvest festivals
Religious festivals in Tibet